Praemastus steinbachi is a moth in the subfamily Arctiinae. It was described by Rothschild in 1909. It is found in Argentina.

References

Natural History Museum Lepidoptera generic names catalog

Moths described in 1909
Arctiinae